The 17th Bangladesh National Film Awards, presented by Ministry of Information, Bangladesh to felicitate the best of Bangladeshi Cinema released in the year 1992. The ceremony took place in Dhaka and awards were given by then President of Bangladesh. The National Film Awards are the only film awards given by the government itself. Every year, a national panel appointed by the government selects the winning entry, and the award ceremony is held in Dhaka. 1992 was the 17th ceremony of National Film Awards.

List of winners
This year awards were given in 23 categories.

Merit Awards

Technical Awards

Special Awards
 Special Award - Abdul Jabbar Khan (posthumous)

See also
Meril Prothom Alo Awards
Ifad Film Club Award
Babisas Award

References

External links

National Film Awards (Bangladesh) ceremonies
1992 film awards
1992 awards in Bangladesh
1992 in Dhaka